Tore Gullen (born 11 June 1949) is a Norwegian cross-country skier. He was born in Jevnaker, and represented the club Jevnaker IF. He competed at the 1980 Winter Olympics in Lake Placid, where he placed 30th in the 15 km.

He was Norwegian champion in 15 km in 1977 and in 30 km in 1981.

Cross-country skiing results
All results are sourced from the International Ski Federation (FIS).

Olympic Games

World Cup

Season standings

References

External links

1949 births
Living people
People from Jevnaker
Norwegian male cross-country skiers
Olympic cross-country skiers of Norway
Cross-country skiers at the 1980 Winter Olympics
Sportspeople from Innlandet